MoD Sealand (formerly RAF Sealand), is a Ministry of Defence installation in Flintshire, in the northeast corner of Wales, close to the border with England. It is a former Royal Air Force station, active between 1916 and 2006.

Under defence cuts announced in 2004 RAF Sealand was completely closed in April 2006. All remaining RAF units were moved to RAF Leeming, and the site is now operated as a tri-service MoD installation.

Early history
Clwyd-Powys Archaeological Trust says the site is nationally important as it became home in 1916 to a flying school which, during World War I, was requisitioned by the War Office becoming RAF Sealand in 1924. 
The report said: "The site of the former Dutton's Flying School is an incredibly important historical location, effectively the origin point of the initial Royal Flying Corps and later RAF as a fighting force. 
"The degree to which any traces of Dutton's aerodrome survive as sub-surface deposits is currently unknown as there have been no investigative works." The trust hopes the area can be excavated as part of the site's development.

It was originally a civilian airfield and was taken over by the military in 1916 for training. Two twin hangars, which were built in 1917, were used by the newly formed Royal Flying Corps. Originally named RFCS Shotwick and later RAF Shotwick, the station was finally named RAF Sealand in June 1924.

Immediately before World War II and in the early years of that war, it was the home of No. 5 Flying Training School RAF (5 FTS), equipped with Airspeed Oxfords.  During the war, the Flying Training Schools provided what was in effect intermediate training for pilots who had received ab initio training and flown solo at an EFTS (Elementary Flying Training School) and who had subsequently been inducted into the RAF.  Pilots thus arrived at No. 5 FTS RAF Sealand as APOs (Acting Pilot Officers) and upon satisfactory completion of intermediate training became Pilot Officers (POs), and were prepared for posting to a squadron or OTU (Operational Training Unit). Kenneth Cross spent time at No. 5 FTS as an instructor in the early 1930s.  From 5 August 1940, the CFI (Chief Flying Instructor) was Edward Mortlock Donaldson.  Amongst the pilots who trained at 5 FTS, RAF Sealand was Johnnie Johnson.

No. 30 Maintenance Unit RAF was formed there in 1937. In 1941 No. 19 Elementary Flying Training School RAF equipped with Tiger Moths was located at RAF Sealand.

In 1951 the station was taken over by the United States Air Force. The 30th Air Depot Wing was located at Sealand, but plans were made to relocate it to RAF Brize Norton, both in the UK. Most assigned personnel of the 30th Air Depot Group were reassigned to the 7558th Air Depot Group of the 59th Air Depot Wing, effective from 26 November 1951. All staff sections of the 30th Air Depot Wing were dissolved, and a Consolidated Adjutant and Military Personnel Section was formed. 30th Air Depot Wing was relieved from assignment to the 59th Air Depot Wing effective 27 November 1951. 30th Air Depot Wing began operating as a tenant organization at RAF Sealand, with base support for the wing being provided by the 7558th Air Depot Group as of 27 November 1951. Jurisdiction of RAF Sealand was transferred from the 30th Air Depot Wing to the 7558th Air Depot Wing on 27 November 1951. It was handed back to the RAF in 1957.

Operational station
Sealand was a communications support base for RAF operations around the world.  It functioned as a third-line repair station for avionics equipment for all three services. The Royal Air Force Almanac 1995 said that No. 30 Maintenance Unit RAF was at the time the main unit for airborne electronic and instrument equipment. It serviced more than 100,000 items of airborne radio, radar, electronic, instrument, and missile equipment a year. It also calibrated and manufactured test equipment.

Examples of equipment serviced: C12 Directional Gyroscope (Hercules), and other gyroscopic based navigational equipment.

No. 631 Volunteer Gliding Squadron RAF operated at Sealand between 1963 and 2006, initially operating the Slingsby T.21 "Sedbergh" glider and then, most recently, flying the Viking TMk1 conventional winch-launched glider.

The gate guard at the main gate until 1988 was Spitfire TD248. It was restored to flying condition in the 1990s.

In March 2006, No. 631 VGS relocated to RAF Woodvale to operate the Grob109b 'Vigilant' self-launched motorglider.

Civilian Technical Training school

Sealand was home to the Civilian Technical Training School giving training in avionics, radio, radar and flight instrumentation. The school also trained ATTOs (Assistant Telecommunications Technical Officers (formerly Radio Technician)), ATTs (Avionics Trainee Technicians), and apprentices.

The following apprenticeships were offered:
 Craft Technician
 Instrument Maker 
 Electrical
 Radio Technician

Recent history
 2001–2008 Defence Aviation Repair Agency (DARA)
 2008–2015 Defence Support Group
 2015 – DECA (Defence Electronics and Components Agency)

Other organisations associated with the station have included the Army Base Repair Organisation (ABRO), the Defence Communication Services Agency (DCSA), and Defence Equipment & Support.

Current use
The Defence Electronics and Components Agency (DECA) occupies part of the original Sealand site since the closure of the RAF station in 2006.  DECA provides maintenance, repair, overhaul and upgrade of defence platform electronics and operates as part of a Trading Agency of the Ministry of Defence.

The MOD has contemplated using the site for several purposes, one of the most controversial of which was the idea to turn RAF Sealand into an emergency prison to cope with overcrowded prisons in England and Wales.

Sealand's ranges are still used for shooting, where units from the services and civilian target shooting clubs come to compete or practice shooting.

From early 2018 MOD Sealand will be an F-35 Global repair hub. This involves multimillion-pound investment in the site.

Northern Gateway
Permission was given in 2012 for a 5,000 job employment site, along with 1,000 homes. In 2015, the Welsh government agreed to fund a link road to the community so that building could start.

In popular culture
The RAF base lent its name to the 1981 song "Sealand" by Wirral band Orchestral Manoeuvres in the Dark.

References

External links

 Defence Electronics and Components Agency
 DSG
 Plans for housing announced
 631 Gliding web site
 BBC News article
 DSG History

Installations of the Ministry of Defence (United Kingdom)
Buildings and structures in Flintshire